This is a list of hospitals in the U.S. state of Colorado.  The American Hospital Directory lists 114 hospitals in Colorado in 2020.

Hospitals

Missing counties
This list does not include any hospitals in Bent County, Colorado, Clear Creek County, Colorado, Costilla County, Colorado, Crowley County, Colorado, Custer County, Colorado, Dolores County, Colorado, Elbert County, Colorado, Gilpin County, Colorado, Hinsdale County, Colorado, Jackson County, Colorado, Mineral County, Colorado, Ouray County, Colorado, Park County, Colorado, Saguache County, Colorado, San Juan County, Colorado, Washington County,  Colorado.

References

External links

Colorado
 
Hospitals